McCollum-Murray House, also known as the C. E. Murray House, is a historic home located at Greeleyville, Williamsburg County, South Carolina. Built , the house was the home of African-American educator Dr. Charles Edward Murray, and is an example of transitional folk Victorian and Classical Revival residential architecture. It was originally a two-story, T-shaped dwelling. It features a wraparound one-story porch. It has a single-story rear gabled addition, with another single-story shed-roofed addition built in the 1950s. 

It was listed in the National Register of Historic Places in 2006.

References

African-American history of South Carolina
Houses on the National Register of Historic Places in South Carolina
Victorian architecture in South Carolina
Neoclassical architecture in South Carolina
Houses completed in 1906
Houses in Williamsburg County, South Carolina
National Register of Historic Places in Williamsburg County, South Carolina
1906 establishments in South Carolina